Lilienthal may refer to:

 Lilienthal (surname)
 Lilienthal, Lower Saxony, a village in Germany
 Lilienthal, the former German name of Białczyn, a village in Poland
 Lilienthal Glacier, Graham Land, Antarctica
 Lilienthal Island, Antarctica
 13610 Lilienthal, an asteroid
 Lilienthal Berlin, a German brand of watches
 Berlin Tegel Airport, also called Otto Lilienthal Airport

See also
 Liliental, a 1978 music group featuring Asmus Tietchens, Conny Plank, Dieter Moebius, and others